The Third Degree Medal for Impeccable Service in Migration Bodies (Azerbaijani: ") is a state award of Azerbaijan, awarded for service to Azerbaijan's State Migration Service. The award was established on November 16, 2012.

Description of the medal
The medal of the Republic of Azerbaijan for impeccable service in the State Migration Service, or migration bodies, is awarded in three degrees—the medal for the 3rd degree being the lowest—to employees with a special rank of service in migration bodies of the Azerbaijan Republic who have completed 10, 15 and 20 calendar years by March 19 of each year for flawless performance of official duties. The medal of the Republic of Azerbaijan of the 3rd degree "For impeccable service in migration bodies" is awarded to the persons who have served in migration bodies for at least 10 years.

The way of wearing
The medal is attached to a 27 mm x 47.5 mm rectangular ribbon with an element for attaching to a garment with a loop. On both sides of the red tape, there are 3 light yellow vertical stripes 1.5 mm wide and 2.5 mm wide, 2 mm apart in the center. A smooth, 4mm wide silver plate is attached to the top of a black ribbon.

References

Sources 
https://migration.gov.az/content/pdf/ae189c133c70a7d5c7d3df4d65d61890.pdf
Regulations on the medal of the Republic of Azerbaijan "For impeccable service in migration bodies" 
"Miqrasiya orqanlarında qulluqda fərqlənməyə görə", "Miqrasiya orqanları ilə səmərəli əməkdaşlığa görə" və "Miqrasiya orqanlarında qüsursuz qulluğa görə" Azərbaycan Respublikası medallarının təsis edilməsi ilə əlaqədar "Azərbaycan Respublikasının orden və medallarının təsis edilməsi haqqında" Azərbaycan Respublikasının Qanununda dəyişikliklər edilməsi barədə" Azərbaycan Respublikasının 2012-ci il 2 noyabr tarixli 454-IVQD nömrəli Qanununda dəyişikliklər edilməsi haqqında Azәrbaycan Respublıkasinin Qanunu 
Article 
The law - elibrary.az 
Azərbaycanda miqrasiya sahəsində çalışanlar üçün yeni medallar təsis olundu news.milli.az 
New medals have been established in Azerbaijan for those working in the field of migration. 
 

Military awards and decorations of Azerbaijan
Awards established in 2018
2018 establishments in Azerbaijan